Roseline or Rose Nonyem Ukeje (born 5 January 1943) is a Nigerian jurist who served as the first female Chief Judge of the High Court of Nigeria.

Life
Rose Nonyem Ukeje was born on 5 January 1943. She was appointed a judge of the High Court in 1986 and served as Chief Judge from 2001 until 2008.

In February 2007, Ujeke was criticised for removing another justice from the forgery case of Andy Uba, to whom her son Obi Ukeje was personal assistant, without notice and taking over the case. In April 2007, she ruled that the Nigerian general election, 2007 could go ahead despite the death of candidate Adebayo Adefarati.

Personal life
Ukeje was married to Nigerian Air Force pilot Captain Sunday Elendu-Ukeje until his death and they had at least two children. Their daughter, Nnenna Elendu Ukeje, has been a member of the National Assembly since 2007.

Works

References

1943 births
Living people
Nigerian women judges
Women chief justices